North Star is a hamlet in northern Alberta, Canada within the County of Northern Lights.

The hamlet is located in Census Division No. 17 and in the federal riding of Peace River.

Demographics 
North Star recorded a population of 49 in the 1991 Census of Population conducted by Statistics Canada.

See also 
List of communities in Alberta
List of hamlets in Alberta

References 

Hamlets in Alberta
County of Northern Lights